Padre nuestro (Spanish for "Our Father") can refer to:

 Padre nuestro (2007 film), a 2007 American–Argentine film
 Padre nuestro (1925 film), a 1925 Argentine film
 Our Father (1953 film), a 1953 Mexican film
 Padre nuestro (1985 film), a 1985 Spanish film
 Padre nuestro (2005 film), a 2005 Chilean film
 "Padre Nuestro," a song by E Nomine